Kye Whyte (born 21 September 1999) is a British male BMX racer. He was a silver medallist at the 2020 Summer Olympics. He competed in the fourteenth series of Dancing on Ice in 2022.

Early life
Whyte started riding BMX at the age of three at Brixton BMX Club in Brockwell Park, south London.  Later, alongside his brothers Daniel and Tre Whyte he attended Peckham BMX Club as a youngster. The club was co-founded by the brothers' father Nigel. Tre and Kye would both become members of the Great Britain Cycling Team, with Kye becoming the eighth member of the Peckham club to do so. Kye suffered a crash shortly after first joining the British Cycling talent group, spending five days in an induced coma and unable to ride for a year.

Career
He won a European championship silver medal behind teammate Kyle Evans in Glasgow in 2018. A first UCI BMX Supercross World Cup victory came in Manchester in April 2019.

At the 2019 UCI BMX World Championships Whyte again looked to be continuing his form on his way to the final, but his hopes of a medal were ended as he was caught behind a crash, eventually finishing fifth.

On 20 June 2021, he was named in the British team for the delayed 2020 Tokyo Olympics, where he won a silver medal in a close contest with the Netherlands' Niek Kimmann.

Outside of BMX racing, he was announced to take part in the fourteenth series of Dancing on Ice.

Major results
2018
 2018 European Championships
2nd Men's BMX racing

2021
 2020 Tokyo Olympic Games
2nd  BMX racing

2022
 2022 UCI BMX World Championships
2nd Men's BMX racing

 2022 European BMX Championships
1st Men's BMX racing

References

External links
 
 
 
 
 
 
 

1999 births
Living people
BMX riders
British male cyclists
Olympic cyclists of Great Britain
Olympic silver medallists for Great Britain
Olympic medalists in cycling
English Olympic medallists
Cyclists at the 2020 Summer Olympics
Medalists at the 2020 Summer Olympics
Black British sportspeople
Cyclists from Greater London
People from Peckham
Place of birth missing (living people)